Brandon Renkart (born December 29, 1984) is a former American football linebacker. He played college football at Rutgers. He was also a practice squad player for the New York Jets and Arizona Cardinals.

Early years
Renkart grew up in Piscataway, New Jersey and played at Piscataway Township High School, where he quarterbacked the football team to a 12–0 record and the Group IV State title as a senior.

College football
Renkart played college football as a walk-on at Rutgers from 2005 to 2007.  He tallied 54 tackles in 2006 and 67 in 2007. As a senior, he was selected as a team captain. He was also a semifinalist for the Draddy Award in 2007.

Professional career

New York Jets
Renkart was signed by the New York Jets as an undrafted free agent after the 2008 NFL Draft. He spent most of the  season on their Practice Squad before being cut during final roster cuts before the  season.

Arizona Cardinals
After being released by the Jets, Renkart signed for the Arizona Cardinals. He spent most of the 2009 season on their Practice Squad before being signed off the Cardinals' Practice Squad by the Indianapolis Colts.

Indianapolis Colts
Renkart signed with the Indianapolis Colts on 30 December 2009; he was waived on 17 June 2010 to make room for kicker Garrett Lindholm, whom they signed off waivers from the Atlanta Falcons.

Pittsburgh Steelers
The Pittsburgh Steelers signed Renkart on August 12, 2010, after linebacker Andre Frazier was placed on injured reserve.

References

External links
Arizona Cardinals bio
Indianapolis Colts bio
New York Jets bio

1984 births
Living people
People from Piscataway, New Jersey
Piscataway High School alumni
Players of American football from New Jersey
Sportspeople from Middlesex County, New Jersey
American football linebackers
Rutgers Scarlet Knights football players
New York Jets players
Arizona Cardinals players
Indianapolis Colts players
Pittsburgh Steelers players